Jamie Silverstein (born December 23, 1983) is an American former competitive ice dancer. With Justin Pekarek, she is the 2000 Four Continents bronze medalist, the 1999 World Junior champion, and 2000 U.S. silver medalist. With Ryan O'Meara, she is the 2006 U.S. bronze medalist and competed at the 2006 Winter Olympics.

Early life 
Silverstein was born in Pittsburgh, Pennsylvania. She grew up in Mt. Lebanon, Pennsylvania, near Pittsburgh. After her parents divorced when she was 11, she moved with her mother to Michigan.

Skating career 
Early in her career, Silverstein competed with Justin Pekarek. They won the 1999 World Junior and U.S. Junior titles. The next season, they moved up to the senior level. They won gold at the 1999 Nebelhorn Trophy, silver at the 2000 U.S. Championships, and bronze at the 2000 Four Continents. They announced their split on January 10, 2001. Silverstein later revealed that she had battled eating disorders, anorexia and bulimia, during her career.

Silverstein trained briefly with Brandon Forsyth but never competed with him. She left competitive skating for a period and attended Cornell University. She was off the ice completely for two years, stepping onto the ice again in late 2004. Silverstein decided to make a return to competition. In April 2005, she began training with Ryan O'Meara. They won the bronze medal at the 2006 U.S. Championships and qualified for the 2006 Winter Olympics. They were coached by Igor Shpilband and Marina Zueva in Canton, Michigan.

On May 3, 2006, Silverstein and O'Meara announced that they would take time off from competitive skating, with Silverstein planning to return to school.

Later life and career 
In 2008, Silverstein graduated from Cornell University with a degree as a College Scholar, choosing to specialize in catharsis and emotional psychology. Her thesis work involved a performance piece whose subject was Ekman's six basic emotions. Now she works as a yoga instructor and is an advocate in eating disorder recovery. She also maintains a blog.

In 2012, Silverstein opened a yoga studio, The Grinning Yogi, in Seattle.

Programs

With O'Meara

With Pekarek

Competitive highlights 
GP: Grand Prix; JGP: Junior Series / Junior Grand Prix

With O'Meara

With Pekarek

See also
List of select Jewish figure skaters

References

External links
Official website
U.S. Olympic team bio
"The Tribe goes to Torino: Sketches of Jewish Olympic-Bound Athletes", 2/16/06

1983 births
Living people
American female ice dancers
Cornell University alumni
Figure skaters at the 2006 Winter Olympics
Jewish American sportspeople
Olympic figure skaters of the United States
People from Bloomfield Hills, Michigan
Sportspeople from Pittsburgh
Four Continents Figure Skating Championships medalists
World Junior Figure Skating Championships medalists
21st-century American Jews
21st-century American women